Breanna Nicole Yde (born June 11, 2003) is an American child actress. She portrayed Frankie Hathaway on the television series The Haunted Hathaways, Tomika on School of Rock, Zoey in the television film Santa Hunters, Akimi in Escape from Mr. Lemoncello's Library, and Gina on the Netflix television series Malibu Rescue.

Early life

Yde was born in Sydney, Australia. At the age of two, she moved to Los Angeles, California. She is a dual citizen of both the United States and Australia. In 2008, her family moved to Rancho Santa Fe, California, and she began taking acting and music lessons at age 6 the following year. She and her family moved back to Los Angeles in 2012 to further pursue acting roles.

Career

Yde earned an early role in the film, Level 26: Dark Prophecy in 2009. In 2011, she appeared in a guest role on an episode of the television series, How I Met Your Mother. Other early acting gigs included national commercials for companies, including McDonald's, AT&T, Toyota, and others. In 2012, she was cast as Frankie Hathaway on the Nickelodeon series, The Haunted Hathaways. In 2014, she appeared in the Nickelodeon television film, Santa Hunters. In 2016, she began starring as Tomika on School of Rock, another Nickelodeon series based on the 2003 film of the same name. She was nominated for the Kids' Choice Award for Favorite Female TV Star for her role as Tomika in 2017. School of Rock aired for three seasons, ending in 2018.

During her time on School of Rock, she had a recurring role as the voice of Ronnie Anne on the Nickelodeon animated series, The Loud House and appeared in the Nickelodeon television film, Escape from Mr. Lemoncello's Library. She also provided the voice of Young Mariah for the animated film, Mariah Carey's All I Want For Christmas Is You in 2017. In 2019, Yde starred as Gina in the Netflix film, Malibu Rescue. The film was followed by a series of the same name in which Yde reprised her role. She again appeared as Gina in a second film, Malibu Rescue: The Next Wave, which was released by Netflix in August 2020.

In 2019, Yde began collaborating with pop songwriter Justin Tranter, and in 2020, she released her debut singles, "Stopped Buying Diamonds" and "BlindLife" (both co-written with Tranter) through Warner Records, under the mononym YDE. In December 2021, she starred as Sophia alongside Idina Menzel in a production of WILD: A Musical Becoming staged at the Loeb Drama Center by the American Repertory Theater in Cambridge, Massachusetts. In 2022, she began releasing new singles from her debut EP, SEND HELP, on which she serves as the executive producer and primary songwriter. The EP was released on September 9, 2022, via Warner Records.

Filmography

Awards and nominations

References

External links 
 
Official webpage

2003 births
21st-century American actresses
Actresses from Los Angeles
Actresses from Sydney
American child actresses
American television actresses
American voice actresses
Living people